The  is located at the southwest base of Mount Fuji in Fujinomiya, Shizuoka Prefecture, Japan.The Asagiri Plateau is richly utilized for its pasture land and many dairy farms are situated along it.

Asagiri Kogen is also home to one of the most spectacular Hang-gliding and Paragliding sites in Japan.  With the backdrop of Fuji-san providing breathtaking photo opportunities, the site is extremely popular with both international and Japanese pilots alike.

Climate
The summer climate is regarded as cool and comfortable, though the weather often changes. Fog can cover the plateau quickly, which gave rise to its name, which means "foggy morning."

The winter climate tends to be very cold.

See also
13th World Scout Jamboree

External links

Fujinomiya home page
Asagiri Plateau Road Station 

Plateaus of Japan
Tourist attractions in Shizuoka Prefecture
Landforms of Shizuoka Prefecture
Fujinomiya, Shizuoka